Christopher Columbus Harris (January 28, 1842 – December 28, 1935) represented Alabama's 8th congressional district in the United States House of Representatives.

Early life 
Harris was born in Lawrence County, Alabama near the community of Mount Hope. His education consisted of both the public schools and private tutoring. When the American Civil War began, Harris enlisted in the Confederate States of America army. He was assigned to the Sixteenth Alabama Infantry, Company F. He progressed through the ranks, attaining the rank of lieutenant. At a point, Harris was captured and taken as a prisoner of war by the Union. He was held at Camp Chase, Ohio, until the war ended.

Postwar activities 
Upon returning to Alabama, Harris served as Clerk of the Circuit Court of Lawrence County from 1865-1867. He studied law and began to practice in Moulton, Alabama. In 1872, Harris moved to the larger city of Decatur, Alabama, where he continued his practice of law. In 1887 he was instrumental in establishing the First National Bank of Decatur and served as its president until 1913.

Politics 
In that year he established the Bank of Commerce and became its president.  He also became the chairman of the Democratic executive committee for the 8th district and was elected to fill the unexpired term of William Richardson, who had died in office. He served from May 1914 until March 1915. He did not seek reelection.

Later life 
After his Washington work, Harris returned to Alabama and served as president of City National Bank in Decatur. He was later named to the Chairmanship of the bank. he died December 28, 1935. He is buried in the Decatur City Cemetery, Decatur, Alabama.

References 
Biographies of the United States Congress Christopher Columbus Harris, Accessed 20 April 2007.

1842 births
1935 deaths
Democratic Party members of the Alabama House of Representatives
People from Lawrence County, Alabama
Politicians from Decatur, Alabama
Democratic Party members of the United States House of Representatives from Alabama
20th-century American politicians